Adam Sędziwój Czarnkowski, of the Nałęcz coat-of-arms (1555–1628) was a Polish nobleman (szlachcic).

Adam was voivode of Łęczyca Voivodeship, participant of King Stefan Batory`s wars against Muscovy, member of the Sejm, general starost of Greater Poland from 1593 to 1628. He serves as mediator during the Zebrzydowski Rebellion. In 1606–09 he participated in wars against Turkey and Sweden.

1555 births
1628 deaths
Clan of Nałęcz